Didier Munyaneza (born 1 January 1998) is a Rwandan cyclist, who currently rides for UCI Continental team .

Major results

2017
 2nd Time trial, National Under-23 Road Championships
 8th Overall Tour of Rwanda
2018
 1st  Road race, National Road Championships
 Africa Cup
2nd Team time trial
7th Road race
 African Road Championships
3rd Under-23 road race
9th Road race
 8th Overall Tour of Rwanda
 9th Overall Tour de l'Espoir
2019
 1st  Overall Tour du Sénégal
1st  Young rider classification
 4th Overall Grand Prix Chantal Biya
 8th Overall La Tropicale Amissa Bongo
1st  Young rider classification
2020
 8th Overall Grand Prix Chantal Biya

References

External links

1998 births
Living people
Rwandan male cyclists
Competitors at the 2019 African Games
African Games medalists in cycling
African Games bronze medalists for Rwanda